Gadinkame Malebogo Modise (born 6 February 1999) is a South African professional soccer player who plays as a left-back or left midfielder for Maritzburg United, on loan from Mamelodi Sundowns. Modise has previously spent time on loan at M Tigers and has played internationally for South Africa at under-17 and under-20 levels.

Club career
Modise was born in Mahikeng but moved to in order to join the academy of Mamelodi Sundowns. Having previously has a spell on loan at M Tigers between 2018 and 2020, he was promoted to the Sundowns senior squad in summer 2020. He joined Maritzburg United on loan for the 2020–21 season in October 2020.

International career
Modise has made 10 appearances for the South Africa national under-17 team and has also represented South Africa at under-20 level.

Style of play
Modise can play as a left-back or as a left midfielder, earning him the nickname 'Bale', after Gareth Bale.

References

External links
 

1998 births
Living people
South African soccer players
People from Mahikeng
Association football fullbacks
Association football midfielders
Mamelodi Sundowns F.C. players
M Tigers F.C. players
Maritzburg United F.C. players
JDR Stars F.C. players
South African Premier Division players
South Africa youth international soccer players
South Africa under-20 international soccer players